Luciogobius albus is a species of goby endemic to Japan where it is found in fresh and brackish underground waters near the coasts. This species and its close relative L. pallidus are the only known cavefish in Japan.

Sources

albus
Freshwater fish of Japan
Endemic fauna of Japan
Cave fish
Taxonomy articles created by Polbot
Fish described in 1940